Ancylometis is a genus of moths in the family Oecophoridae. The species of this genus are found on the Indian Ocean islands of Madagascar, Mauritius and Réunion.

Species
Ancylometis ansarti Guillermet, 2010
Ancylometis asbolopa Meyrick, 1923
Ancylometis celineae Guillermet, 2010
Ancylometis dilucida Meyrick, 1910 (from Mauritius)
Ancylometis glebaria (Meyrick, 1910)
Ancylometis hemilyca (Meyrick, 1910)
Ancylometis isophaula Meyrick, 1934 (from Madagascar)
Ancylometis lavergnella Guillermet, 2011
Ancylometis metacrocota Meyrick, 1930 (from Mauritius)
Ancylometis mulaella Guillermet, 2011
Ancylometis orphania (Meyrick, 1910)
Ancylometis paulianella Viette, 1957
Ancylometis phylotypa Meyrick, 1930 (from Mauritius)
Ancylometis ribesae Viette, 1996
Ancylometis scaeocosma Meyrick, 1887
Ancylometis trigonodes Meyrick, 1887 (from Mauritius)

References
 Meyrick, E. 1887b. Descriptions of some exotic Micro-Lepidoptera. - Transactions of the entomological Society of London 1887(2):269–280. (on page 276)

Oecophoridae
Moth genera
Moths of Africa